Nam Phong railway station is a railway station located in Wang Chai Subdistrict, Nam Phong District, Khon Kaen Province.

References 

Railway stations in Thailand
Khon Kaen province